Canal+ Afrique is an African version of Canal+, available mainly in the francophone countries of Central and West Africa, as well as some non-francophone countries such as Sierra Leone, Nigeria, Ghana and Cape Verde. The Service is broadcast off the Satellite NSS 7 at 22° West.

Channels list

Canal+
 Canal+
 Canal+ Cinéma
 Canal+ Séries
 Canal+ Family
 Canal+ Sport
 Canal+ Premium
 Canal+ Sport
 Canal+ Seriale

Entertainment
 TF1
 France 2
 France 3
 France 5
 M6
 Arte
 D8
 Canal+ Domo
 NT1
 Nollywood TV
 Novelas TV
 Novelas+
 WION
 Zee Magic

Children's
 Télétoon+
 Piwi+
 Disney Channel
 Nickelodeon
 Gulli
 TiJi
 Canal J
 Disney XD
 Cartoon Network
 Disney Junior
 Boomerang
  Toonami

Hindi
DD India
DD News
Zee News
Republic TV
Star Plus
Zee TV
Sony Entertainment Television
Times Now
Sony Pix
Zee Tamil
Zee Anmol

Cinema
 Paramount TV
 Canal+ Film
 Ciné+ Star
 Ciné+ Frisson
 Ciné+ Emotion
 Action HD
 Canal Hollywood
 Disney Cinema
MN+
Zee Studio
Zee Cinema
Sony Max
DD National
Star Gold

Music
9XO
Zing
Zee ETC Bollywood
MTV Bets
9XM
M Tune
Music Now

See also 
 Canal+ Group
 Canal+ (French TV provider)
 Canal+ Calédonie
 Canal+ Caraïbes
 DStv
StarTimes

References

External links
 Official Site

Mass media in Africa
Afrique
Direct broadcast satellite services